Choi Soon-ho (Hangul: 최순호; Hanja: 崔淳鎬; born 10 January 1962) is a former South Korean football manager and player.

International career 
Choi was named in the South Korean squad for the 1980 AFC Asian Cup. He scored seven goals including two goals against Kuwait, and a hat-trick against United Arab Emirates in the group stage. South Korea met Kuwait again at the final, but they lost this time. Choi became the youngest player to be the top scorer in the history of the AFC Asian Cup at age 18.

In March 1981, he won the 1980 AFC Youth Championship, in which he scored four goals, with the South Korea under-20 team. He also played at the 1981 FIFA World Youth Championship in the same year. He defeated Italy 4–1 in the first game by recording two goals and two assists. However, South Korea was eliminated in the group stage after losing to Romania and Brazil.

Choi was selected for the South Korean squad for the 1986 FIFA World Cup. He contributed to more than half of the team's 17 goals with one goal and eight assists in eight games of the qualification. He scored a goal outside the penalty area against Italy. He finally recorded two assists as well as a goal in the World Cup, proving his abilities outside Asia.

A Serie A club Juventus was interested in Choi after the World Youth Championship. Its interest lasted until the end of the 1986 World Cup, but his team POSCO consistently rejected its offer.

Style of play 
Regarded as one of the most technically gifted forwards in South Korea, Choi was proficient at controlling the ball with various skills including shot, dribble, touch, and pass. He also showed good speed, wide vision and supple body, having hardly any weak point. He normally played as a striker, but he could also play as an attacking midfielder to create chances.

Career statistics

Club

International 
 
Results list South Korea's goal tally first.

Honours

Player
POSCO Atoms
K League 1: 1986
Korean Semi-professional League: 1982
Korean Semi-professional League (Autumn): 1981
Korean National Championship runner-up: 1985

Lucky-Goldstar Hwangso
K League 1: 1990
Korean National Championship: 1988

South Korea U20
AFC Youth Championship: 1980

South Korea
Asian Games: 1986
AFC Asian Cup runner-up: 1980
Dynasty Cup: 1990
Afro-Asian Cup of Nations: 1987

Individual
AFC Asian Cup top goalscorer: 1980
AFC Asian Cup Team of the Tournament: 1980
Korean FA Best XI: 1980, 1984, 1985, 1986
AFC Youth Championship Most Valuable Player: 1980
AFC Youth Championship top goalscorer: 1980
K League 1 Best XI: 1984
Korean FA Player of the Year: 1990
K League 30th Anniversary Best XI: 2013
K League Hall of Fame: 2023

Manager
Hyundai Mipo Dockyard
Korea National League: 2007, 2008
Korean President's Cup: 2008

Individual
Korea National League Manager of the Year: 2007, 2008
Korean President's Cup Best Manager: 2008

References

External links
 
 Choi Soon-ho – National Team Stats  at KFA 
  
 
 International Appearances & Goals

1962 births
Living people
Association football midfielders
South Korean footballers
South Korean expatriate footballers
South Korea international footballers
South Korean football managers
Pohang Steelers managers
Gangwon FC managers
Pohang Steelers players
FC Seoul players
FC Seoul non-playing staff
Rodez AF players
K League 1 players
Ligue 2 players
1980 AFC Asian Cup players
1986 FIFA World Cup players
1990 FIFA World Cup players
Footballers at the 1988 Summer Olympics
Olympic footballers of South Korea
People from Cheongju
Expatriate footballers in France
South Korean expatriate sportspeople in France
Asian Games medalists in football
Footballers at the 1982 Asian Games
Footballers at the 1986 Asian Games
Footballers at the 1990 Asian Games
Asian Games gold medalists for South Korea
Asian Games bronze medalists for South Korea
Medalists at the 1986 Asian Games
Medalists at the 1990 Asian Games
FIFA Century Club
Sportspeople from North Chungcheong Province